Et Fugit Intera Fugit Irreparabile Tempus is the debut album by the experimental black metal band Spektr. This album is often mistakenly titled "No Longer Human Senses", which is actually the album's subtitle.

Track listing
"No Longer Human Senses" — 9:03
"Post Fatalism" — 04:18
"Reveal the Four Seals" — 05:07
"Nothing's Been Worth Saving (The Procession)" — 05:41
"A Return to the Flesh" — 05:37
"Wizened Hand" — 08:14
"...With Only One Eye" — 02:06
"Confusion / The Persistence" (Ending Contakt) — 06:48

Musicians
kl.K. (aka Krig) — drums, vocals, samples, programming
Hth — guitars, bass, vocals, samples, programming

External links
Metal Archives

2004 debut albums
Spektr (band) albums